Ollerton Colliery F.C. was an English football club.

History
The club were members of the Yorkshire League for three years prior to the Second World War, finishing as runners-up in 1938. After the war they joined the Midland League but resigned after three years of finishing in league's lower reaches.

They also competed in the FA Cup from 1934–35 to 1949–50, reaching the 3rd Qualifying Round on three occasions.

References

Defunct football clubs in Nottinghamshire
Central Combination
Yorkshire Football League
Midland Football League (1889)
East Midlands Regional League
Mining association football teams in England